Dirillo Lake is an artificial lake to the south of Licodia Eubea in the Province of Catania, Sicily, Italy, which was formed in the 1950s by damming the river Dirillo.

Lakes of Sicily